Ionuț Andrei Peteleu (born 20 August 1992) is a Romanian professional footballer who plays as a right back for Liga I club CFR Cluj.

Club career
On 16 August 2021, Peteleu signed with Kisvárda in Hungary.

Honours

Club
CFR Cluj
Liga I: 2017–18, 2018–19
Supercupa României: 2018

References

External links

1992 births
Living people
Sportspeople from Bistrița
Romanian footballers
Romania under-21 international footballers
Romania youth international footballers
Association football defenders
FC Delta Dobrogea Tulcea players
ACF Gloria Bistrița players
ASA 2013 Târgu Mureș players
AFC Săgeata Năvodari players
FC Petrolul Ploiești players
CFR Cluj players
FC Sheriff Tiraspol players
FC UTA Arad players
Kisvárda FC players
Liga I players
Liga II players
Moldovan Super Liga players
Nemzeti Bajnokság I players
Romanian expatriate footballers
Expatriate footballers in Moldova
Romanian expatriate sportspeople in Moldova
Expatriate footballers in Hungary
Romanian expatriate sportspeople in Hungary